Enterolobium is a genus of 12 species of flowering plants in the family Fabaceae, native to tropical and warm-temperate regions of the Americas. They are medium-sized to large trees.

Species
Enterolobium barinense Cardenas & Rodriguez
Enterolobium barnebianum Mesquita & M.F.Silva
Enterolobium contortisiliquum (Vell.) Morong
Enterolobium cyclocarpum (Jacq.) Griseb. - Guanacaste (Central Mexico south to Northern Brazil)
Enterolobium ellipticum Benth.
Enterolobium glaziovii (Benth.) Mesquita
Enterolobium gummiferum (Mart.) J. F. Macbr.
Enterolobium maximum Ducke
Enterolobium monjollo Benth.
Enterolobium oldemanii Barneby & J.W. Grimes
Enterolobium schomburgkii (Benth.) Benth.
Enterolobium timbouva Mart.

References

External links

 
Neotropical realm flora
Fabaceae genera